Detente is an album by the American jazz fusion group, the Brecker Brothers. It was released by Arista Records in 1980.

Reception
AllMusic awarded the album with 3 stars and its review by Jason Elias states: "Dream Theme", arranged by Michael Brecker, is the album's best song, reflective yet not melancholy, with his saxophone felt and flawless throughout. The last track, "I Don't Know Either", has solos from both of the Brecker Brothers, and displays the level of skill that many jazz outfits simply didn't possess".

Track listing
 "You Ga (Ta Give It)" (Randy Brecker) - 4:30
 "Not Tonight" (Michael Brecker, Neil Jason) - 3:56
 "Don’t Get Funny With My Money" (Randy Brecker) - 4:34
 "Tee’d Off" (Michael Brecker) - 3:44
 "You Left Something Behind" (Randy Brecker, Debra Barsha) - 4:05
 "Squish" (Randy Brecker) - 5:51
 "Dream Theme" (Michael Brecker) - 5:39
 "Baffled" (Randy Brecker) - 5:22
 "I Don’t Know Either" (Michael Brecker) - 5:46

Personnel 

The Brecker Brothers
 Michael Brecker – tenor saxophone, handclaps (1, 3), arrangements (1-5, 7, 9), flute (2, 5)
 Randy Brecker – trumpet, lead vocals (1, 3), handclaps (1, 3), arrangements (1, 3, 5-8), flugelhorn (2, 5, 8, 9), Prophet-5 (3)

Other Musicians
 Don Grolnick – Yamaha CP-70 electric grand piano (1, 2), Rhodes piano (7)
 George Duke – lead vocals (1), clavinet (2), backing vocals (2), Yamaha CP-70 electric grand piano (3), Prophet-5 (4, 7, 8, 9), Oberheim 4 Voice (6)
 Mark Gray – Rhodes piano (4, 5, 6, 8, 9) 
 Jeff Mironov – guitars (1, 2, 3, 7)
 David Spinozza – guitars (1, 2, 3, 7)
 Hiram Bullock – guitars (4, 5, 6, 8, 9)
 Marcus Miller – bass (1, 3, 7)
 Neil Jason – bass (2, 4, 5, 6, 8, 9)
 Steve Gadd – drums (1, 2, 3, 7)
 Steve Jordan – drums (4, 5, 6, 8, 9)
 Paulinho da Costa – percussion (1, 3)
 Ralph MacDonald – percussion (2, 5, 7)
 Airto Moreira – percussion (6, 8, 9)
 Carl Carwell – handclaps (1), lead vocals (1, 2), backing vocals (2)
 Sue Ann Carwell – handclaps (1), backing vocals (2)
 Erik Zobler – handclaps (1)
 Bill Reichenbach Jr. – handclaps (3)
 D.J. Rogers – lead vocals (1), vocal ad-libs (1)
 Irene Cara – backing vocals (1, 3, 5)
 Ullanda McCullough – backing vocals (1, 3, 5)
 Paulette McWilliams – backing vocals (1, 3, 5)
 Fonzi Thornton – backing vocals (1, 3, 5)
 Luther Vandross – backing vocals (1, 3, 5), group vocal arrangements (3)

Production
 George Duke – producer 
 Tommy Vicari – engineer, remixing 
 Jay Burnett – assistant engineer 
 James Farber – assistant engineer 
 Garry Rindfuss – assistant engineer
 John Terelle – assistant engineer 
 Raymond Willard – assistant engineer 
 Erik Zobler – assistant engineer 
 Brian Gardner – mastering at Allen Zentz Mastering (San Clemente, CA)
 Donn Davenport – art direction 
 Phenographix Inc. – design 
 John Pinderhughes – photography 
 Webster McKnight – hair stylist 
 Fran Cooper – make-up 
 Lisa Daurio – stylist 
 Fred Heller Enterprises, Ltd. – management

References

1980 albums
Brecker Brothers albums
Arista Records albums